Karimabad-e Jadval-e Now (also Romanized as Karīmābād-e Jadval-e Now; also known as Jadval-e Now and Qal‘eh-i-Nau) is a village in Derak Rural District, in the Central District of Shiraz County, Fars Province, Iran. At the 2006 census, its population was 49, in 11 families.

References 

Populated places in Shiraz County